The J.W. Knapp Company, more commonly known as "Knapp's", was a chain of department stores based in Lansing, Michigan.

History

In 1893, Joseph W. Knapp, a salesman originally from Hillsdale, Michigan opened a dry-goods, coat and carpet store in Albion, Michigan in partnership with Frank W. Jewett, called Jewett & Knapp. By 1897, the store had relocated to 123 N.  Washington Avenue in Lansing, occupying  of space at the site of a former dry-goods store.

In 1908, Jewett and Knapp sold the business to Frank Lackey, who renamed the store "J.W. Knapp Company".  Knapp remained in charge of company operations, with Lackey as a silent partner. Knapp's billed itself in advertising of the day as "Lansing's Busy Reliable Store".

The same year, the business moved to 220-226 South Washington. By 1918, Knapp's had incorporated a specialty gift store into its  business, the "Kenilworth Gift Shop" in partnership with Kenilworth Studios of Chicago, and involving an extensive advertising campaign. In 1923, Knapp's supplied the latest current fashions to costume participants in a musical revue at Michigan Agricultural College in nearby East Lansing. In 1928 the store was expanded and renovated at a cost of $15,000 to help it compete with the rival F.W. Arbaugh Company. The new South Washington store featured a pneumatic cash transportation tube system.

In 1937, Knapp's commenced construction of a new building, completed in 1939, at 300 S. Washington, on the site of the Hotel Downey, which was demolished to make room for the new store, and the still earlier Lansing House hotel and saloon. The store expanded by the 1940s to cover a full city block.

In the 1950s, the company was sold to the Charles Stewart Mott Foundation, which owned a collection of department stores in mid-Michigan, including Smith-Bridgman in Flint; D.M. Christian Company in Owosso, and Robinson's in Battle Creek. Knapp's opened a smaller branch in East Lansing in the early 1960s; this store was later closed, and a newer Knapp's was built as one of the anchor stores of Meridian Mall in Okemos when it opened in 1969. Two additional mall-based locations, at Lansing Mall in Lansing, and at Westwood Mall in Jackson, were acquired 1972 from Grand Rapids-based Wurzburg's.

Extensive television advertising on Channel 6 made Knapp's known throughout Michigan.

In 1970 the L.S. Good Co. of Wheeling, West Virginia bought all of the Mott Foundation divisions; L.S. Good Co. declared bankruptcy in 1980, and all of the Mott Foundation nameplates were shuttered. The three mall-based locations were all sold to JCPenney, while the downtown Lansing location was shuttered.

See also
 J.W. Knapp Company Building

References

Defunct department stores based in Michigan
Defunct companies based in Lansing, Michigan
Retail companies disestablished in 1980